Scalix is an e-mail and groupware server that runs on Linux, licensed under the Scalix Public License (SPL).

The software provides e-mail, group calendaring and other collaborative software, which are standard in groupware. It can be also  be accessed from many different clients, most notably Microsoft Outlook, Novell and Evolution (formerly Ximian. It also has an AJAX-based web email and calendaring client named Scalix Web Access.

Background
The software was released by Scalix Corporation. It was founded by Julie Hanna in 2002, during her tenure as an Entrepreneur In Residence (EIR) at Mayfield Fund. The company was funded by venture firms New Enterprise Associates (NEA), Mohr Davidow Ventures (MDV) and Mayfield Fund. The code is based on the earlier HP OpenMail product, which was licensed from Hewlett-Packard.

In 2006, Scalix had thousands of customers for a total of over a million mailboxes. A majority of customers were migrating away from legacy software like Microsoft Exchange and Lotus Notes.

In July 2007, the company was purchased by Xandros and in July 2011 sold to Sebring Software Inc, a collaborative integration software company offering on-premises and cloud solutions.

On November 11, 2013, a press release announced a management buy-out and the concurrent release of version 12.0.

Products
Scalix includes and provides the following components as part of its offerings:
 Scalix email and calendar server, a full-featured messaging and collaboration server based on Linux and open source
 ScalixConnect for Outlook, robust third-party native and transparent Outlook support
 Scalix Web Access, an AJAX-based cross-browser, cross-platform email and calendaring client that combines desktop email functionality with the convenience of a browser
 Scalix ActiveSync, push email, wireless calendar and contact synchronization using the ActiveSync protocol
 ScalixConnect for Blackberry, allows full integration with BlackBerry Enterprise Server
 ScalixConnect for Evolution, full-function email and calendaring client support for Linux desktop users
 Scalix Wireless Solution, advanced wireless email/PIM support for Blackberries, Treos and Smartphones
 Scalix Administration Console, AJAX-based web client for administering the Scalix server and email users
 ScalixReady for Open Source and Commercial messaging ecosystem components, which certifies that third-party software works with Scalix
 MS Ecosystem Interoperability for seamless co-existence with MS Exchange and Active Directory
 Individual email level backup / restore when using SepSesam
Scalix comes in several different editions: Enterprise, Small Business, Hosted, Community and Raw, the latter two being free software.

Scalix Inc. claims there are 250 Scalix-capable partners and affiliates, worldwide.

Software license
The Scalix Public License is based on the Mozilla Public License (MPL); the modifications have not been approved by the Open Source Initiative.  The SPL adds an appendix (exhibit b) to the MPL requiring that any products derived from Scalix source code display a "Scalix" logo that links back to the Scalix website, and a copyright notice "in the same form as the latest version of the Covered Code distributed by Scalix at the time of distribution of such copy"; see the license for details.

Status
Scalix had a difficult road getting the latest version out, with a maintenance update, announced for Q4/2011, and a major release, announced for Q1/2012, not being released.  After an over-three-year-long wait, the next major release of Scalix, version 12. It was released on November 11, 2013, with support included for Outlook 2010 and 2013.

See also
HP OpenMail
Samsung Contact
SOGo
Tine 2.0
Zarafa Collaboration Platform
Zentyal
Zimbra Collaboration Suite

External links
Scalix Homepage
Scalix Community Forums

References

Free groupware
Free email software